Robert I de Vaux, also known as Robert de Vallibus, Lord of Pentney, was a prominent 11th-century noble. A Norman knight, Robert participated in William, Duke of Normandy's invasion of England in 1066, with his brother Aitard. He obtained lands of Norfolk, Suffolk and Essex in England from Roger Bigod as tenant in chief. Robert was succeeded by his son Robert.

Notes

Citations

References

11th-century English people
Robert